Natalia Suvorova (born 22 August 1995) is a Russian female  BMX rider, representing her nation at international competitions. She competed in the time trial event and race event at the 2015 UCI BMX World Championships.

References

External links
 
 
 
 
 

1995 births
Living people
BMX riders
Russian female cyclists
Olympic cyclists of Russia
Cyclists at the 2020 Summer Olympics
European Games competitors for Russia
Cyclists at the 2015 European Games
Place of birth missing (living people)